The Embassy of the State of Palestine in Saudi Arabia is the diplomatic mission of the Palestine in Saudi Arabia. It is located in Riyadh.

See also

List of diplomatic missions in Saudi Arabia.
List of diplomatic missions of Palestine.

References

Diplomatic missions of the State of Palestine
Diplomatic missions in Saudi Arabia
State of Palestine–Saudi Arabia relations